The 2009 F2000 Championship Series season was the fourth season of competition in the series. It consisted of 12 rounds (six double-race weekends), beginning April 10 at Virginia International Raceway and concluding August 16 at the Mid-Ohio Sports Car Course. Chris Miller driving for JDC MotorSports won four races and on his way to the close fought championship over the St. Clair Motorsports entry of Matthew Inge as well as other contenders Remy Audette and Benjamin Searcy. Tom Fatur won the Masters' championship over Tim Minor by only 7 points despite Minor competing in only six races and Fatur driving the entire schedule.

Race calendar and results

Championship results

This list only contains drivers who registered for the championship.
(M) indicates driver is participating in Masters Class for drivers over 40 years of age.

External links
 Official Series Website

F2000 Championship Series seasons
F2000